Amanda Rodríguez Ramos (born 4 November 1994) is a Dominican footballer who plays as a defender. She has been a member of the Dominican Republic women's national team.

Early life
Rodríguez hails from El Seibo Province.

International career
Rodríguez represented the Dominican Republic at the 2010 CONCACAF Women's U-17 Championship qualifying stage and the 2012 CONCACAF Women's U-20 Championship qualifying. At senior level, she capped during the 2014 Central American and Caribbean Games.

References 

1994 births
Living people
People from El Seibo Province
Dominican Republic women's footballers
Women's association football defenders
Dominican Republic women's international footballers
Competitors at the 2014 Central American and Caribbean Games